Caleb West, Master Diver is a novel published in 1898 by Francis Hopkinson Smith that was the best selling book in the United States in 1898. It was first serialized in The Atlantic Monthly from October 1897 to March 1898, and was published in book form by Houghton Mifflin in April 1898 with illustrations by Malcolm Fraser and Arthur I. Keller.

The book is based on Smith's experience in the building of the Race Rock Light near Fishers Island, New York in the 1870s.

Adaptations

The novel was adapted into a play by Michael Morton.

It was also adapted into a silent film in 1912, and a 1920 silent film called Deep Waters.

References

External links
 
 Caleb West: Master Driver, full scan of 1898 Houghton & Mifflin edition via archive.org
 
  (1912)
 Captain Thomas A. Scott, Master Diver (1908) (Smith's short tribute to the actual master driver on the Race Rock project)

1898 American novels
American novels adapted into films
Novels by Francis Hopkinson Smith
Novels first published in serial form
Novels set in New York (state)
Works originally published in The Atlantic (magazine)